Jan Schweiterman is a former American actor who has appeared in several movies, including Good Burger and Warlock III.

Filmography 

 The Haven (2000) (as Jan Schwartzman) .... Michael Braga
 American Intellectuals (1999) .... Cooper
 Warlock III: The End of Innocence (1999) (V) .... Jerry
 Felicity .... Lewis (4 episodes, 1998–1999)
 Night Man (1 episode, 1998)
 Beyond Belief: Fact or Fiction (1 episode, 1998)
 Fallen Arches (1998) (as Jan Schwieterman) .... Ricky
 Good Burger (1997) – Kurt Bozwell
 Forever (1996) TV series
 Wasted (1996) .... Jesse Roe
 ER .... Daniel Quinn (1 episode, 1994)
 McKenna (1 episode, 1994)

References

External links 

 

20th-century births
Living people
American male film actors
Actors from Fort Wayne, Indiana
American male television actors
Male actors from Indiana
20th-century American male actors
21st-century American male actors
Year of birth missing (living people)